Anle Township is a township under the administration of Jiuzhaigou County in Ngawa Tibetan and Qiang Autonomous Prefecture, northern Sichuan, China. , it has 11 villages under its administration.

See also 
 List of township-level divisions of Sichuan

References 

Township-level divisions of Sichuan
Jiuzhaigou County